All Is Dream is the fifth studio album by American rock band Mercury Rev. It was released in the United Kingdom on August 27, 2001, in France on August 28, 2001, and in the United States on September 11, 2001. The album's front cover features half of the 1991 painting Breakthrough Dreaming by artist and mystic Jennifer Hathaway.

Critical reception

All Is Dream received generally positive reviews from music critics. Q listed All Is Dream as one of the best 50 albums of 2001.

Track listing
All songs written by Jonathan Donahue, Sean "Grasshopper" Mackowiak and Jeff Mercel.

 "The Dark Is Rising" – 4:52
 "Tides of the Moon" – 5:13
 "Chains" – 4:22
 "Lincoln's Eyes" – 7:09
 "Nite and Fog" – 3:58
 "Little Rhymes" – 5:13
 "A Drop in Time" – 4:20
 "You're My Queen" – 2:33
 "Spiders and Flies" – 4:11
 "Hercules" – 7:52
Japanese bonus track
"Cool Waves" – 3:10

Limited edition bonus CD-ROM
The album was also released as a limited edition featuring a CD-ROM with the following tracks:

 "Saw Song (Live)" (Audio track)
 "Hercules (Live)" (Audio track)
 "Little Rhymes (Live)" (Audio track)
 "Nite and Fog" (Video)
 "The Dark Is Rising" (Video)
 "Documentary Footage" (Video)

Personnel
 Jonathan Donahue – words and acoustic guitar
 Grasshopper – moth-light guitars
 Jeff Mercel – drums and piano
 Dave Fridmann – bass guitar and Mellotron
 Tony Visconti – string arrangement, Mellotron, additional orchestration
 Mary Gavassi Fridmann – soprano vocals
 Justin Russo – Rhodes piano
 Jason Russo – electric guitar
 Rex L White – pedal steel
 Suzanne Thorpe – flute
 Joel Eckhaus – bowed saw
 Bethany Crescini – child vocals
 Katie Fox, Amy Helm and Deb Curley – female vocals
 Marc Guy – French horn
 Larry Packer – solo violin
 Gregor Kitzis – violins
 Sarah Adams, Martha Mooke, Laura Seaton – violas
 Maxine Neuman – cello
 Aaron Hurwitz – Hammond organ

Charts

In other media

In his album Falling Off the Bone, comedian Todd Barry recounts the fact that, while in Manhattan on September 11, a friend of his in the crowd recognized Barry and told him, "The new Mercury Rev album is out."

References

Mercury Rev albums
2001 albums
Albums produced by Dave Fridmann